Dimitris Theodorou (born 10 September 1997) is a Cypriot professional footballer who plays as a winger for Cypriot First Division club APOEL and the Cyprus national team.

Club career
Theodorou began playing for the first team of Omonia Aradippou in the Cypriot Second Division during the 2014–15 season, before moving to Enosis Neon Paralimni in July 2019. He made his professional debut for Enosis Neon Paralimni in the Cypriot First Division on 26 August 2019, starting in the match against Ethnikos Achna, which finished as a 3–4 home loss.

International career
Theodorou made his international debut for Cyprus on 16 November 2019 in a UEFA Euro 2020 qualifying match against Scotland, which finished as a 1–2 home loss.

Career statistics

Club

International

References

External links
 
 
 

1997 births
Living people
Cypriot footballers
Cyprus international footballers
Association football forwards
Omonia Aradippou players
Enosis Neon Paralimni FC players
Cypriot First Division players
Cypriot Second Division players